Mabry Mill is a watermill run by the National Park Service located at milepost 176.2 of Blue Ridge Parkway in Floyd County, Virginia. It is a tourist attraction, and a short trail around the mill connects historical exhibits about life in rural Virginia. The trail allows visitors to view the gristmill, sawmill, and blacksmith shop.

Mabry Mill was built by Edwin Boston Mabry (E.B. Mabry). E.B. Mabry returned to Floyd County in 1903 and began the construction of the mill. It was first a blacksmith and wheelwright shop, then became a sawmill. By 1905 it was in operation as a gristmill. By 1910 the front part of the mill was completed and included a lathe for turning out wheel hubs, a tongue and groove lathe, a planer and a jig-saw. Between 1905 and 1914 E.B. Mabry bought adjacent tracts of land, mostly for the purpose of acquiring more water power.

During peak seasons, demonstrations of crafts are given by National Park Service volunteers at Mabry Mill.

External links 

 Blue Ridge Parkway, Mabry Mill, VBR
 National Park Service: Blue Ridge Parkway

Buildings and structures in Floyd County, Virginia
Blue Ridge Mountains
Grinding mills in Virginia
Tourist attractions in Floyd County, Virginia
Blue Ridge Parkway